The 1929 USSR Chess Championship was the 6th edition of USSR Chess Championship. Held from 2 to 20 September in Odessa. The tournament was won by Boris Verlinsky. The event was held outside Moscow and Leningrad for the first time. 36 players competed in four quarterfinal sections, with the top three in each advancing into two six-player semifinals. The top two from each semifinals were then to play a double round final to determine the champion (but due to the withdrawal of one of the finalists, the final tournament had only three players).

Tables and results

Quarterfinals

Semifinals

Final 

Izmailov could not play at the end as he had to go off to take his final exams.

References 

USSR Chess Championships
Championship
Chess
1929 in chess
1929 in the Soviet Union
Chess